Jeon Jung-woo (born 27 May 1994) is a South Korean ice hockey player. He competed in the 2018 Winter Olympics.

References

External links

1994 births
Daemyung Killer Whales players
Living people
Ice hockey players at the 2018 Winter Olympics
South Korean ice hockey forwards
Olympic ice hockey players of South Korea
Asian Games silver medalists for South Korea
Medalists at the 2017 Asian Winter Games
Asian Games medalists in ice hockey
Ice hockey players at the 2017 Asian Winter Games
21st-century South Korean people